= Cigaretta =

Bulgarian band

- Origin: Sofia, Bulgaria
- Genres: Alternative rock, indie rock, progressive rock, experimental
- Years active: 1996–2007
- Label: Stain Studio
- Past members: Vla Doom; Klim End; Mic Hail; Bo Betz; D Echo

Cigaretta was an avant-garde band from Bulgaria. The band's members are Vla Doom (vocals and guitar), Klim End (bass), Mic Hail (drums), Bo Betz (laptop, machines and keyboards) and D Echo (guitar and vocals). The band's music has been labelled “doomy blues”, and has been called difficult to define; they attempt to combine elements of widely varying genres, including alternative, doom metal, and progressive rock.

Cigaretta's discography includes the full-length albums 14 songS, released in December 2003, and Pluke, released in April 2006, both through Stain Studio.
